This article lists the results for the Japan national football team between 2000 and 2009.

2000

2001

2002

2003

2004

2005

2006

2007

2008

2009

References 

Japan national football team results
2000s in Japanese sport